Kirkland is a village in the Eden district of the English county of Cumbria. It is in the historic county of Cumberland. There is a fell called Kirkland Fell.

See also

Listed buildings in Culgaith

References 
Philip's Street Atlas (page 73)

External links
 Cumbria County History Trust: Kirkland and Blencarn (nb: provisional research only – see Talk page)

Villages in Cumbria
Culgaith
Cumberland